Le Grand-Bourg (Limousin: Le Borg) is a commune in the Creuse department in the Nouvelle-Aquitaine region in central France.

Geography
The river Gartempe flows through the middle of the commune's territory.

Population

Sights
 The chateau de Collonges, dating from the eighteenth century.
 The ruins of the chateau du Seigneur.
 The eighteenth-century presbytery.
 The thirteenth-century church.
 A watermill.
 An eighteenth-century chapel.
Set on a hilltop with a 360 degree views overlooking Le Creuse countryside, sits the oldest and most historic castle in the Limousin region is Chateau Du Masgelier, originally built as a medieval defence castle in 1174 dating back to the Knights Templar and once owned by King Louis XIV, the south turret bares the crest of the Fleur De Lis.

See also
Communes of the Creuse department

References

Communes of Creuse